Events from the year 1655 in art.

Paintings

Nicolaes Maes
Eavesdropper with a Scolding Woman
The Idle Servant (National Gallery, London)
The Lacemaker (National Gallery of Canada, Ottawa)
A Woman Spinning (Rijksmuseum, Amsterdam)
A Young Woman Sewing (Guildhall Art Gallery, City of London)
Nicolas Poussin - St. Peter Healing a Sick Man
Rembrandt
(attributed) - The Polish Rider
Christ Presented to the People (Ecce Homo) (drypoint)
Bartholomeus van der Helst - Self-portrait
Diego Velázquez - Infanta Maria Margareta
Vermeer - Christ in the House of Martha and Mary

Births
January 21 - Antonio Molinari, Venetian painter of mythology and religious figures (died 1704)
February 25 - Carel de Moor, Dutch etcher and painter (died 1738)
March 4 - Fra Galgario (Giuseppe Ghislandi), Bergamese painter, mainly of portraits during the Rococo epoch (died 1743)
June 11 - Antonio Cifrondi, Italian painter of genre works (died 1730)
November 16 - Alessandro Gherardini, Italian painter, active mainly in Florence (died 1723)
date unknown
Marie Courtois, French miniature painter (died 1703)
Englebert Fisen, Flemish painter (died 1733)
Johann Ulrich Kraus, German illustrator, engraver and publisher (died 1719)
Antonio Lorenzini,  Italian painter and engraver (died 1740)
Giacomo Pavia, Italian painter, active mainly in his native Bologna (died 1740)
Jacques Prou, French Academic sculptor (died 1706)
Anthoni Schoonjans, Belgian painter (died 1726)
Sébastien Slodtz, French sculptor (died 1726)
Filippo Tancredi, Italian painter of church frescoes (died 1722)
David von Krafft, German-Swedish painter, nephew of David Klöcker Ehrenstrahl and his successor at the Swedish Royal Court (died 1725)

Deaths
April 30 - Eustache Le Sueur or Lesueur, French painter (born 1617)
date unknown
Hendrick Andriessen, Flemish still-life painter (born 1607)
Abraham de Vries, Dutch painter (born 1590)
Giovanni Andrea Donducci (Mastelletta), Italian painter of the Bolognese School (painting) (born 1575)
Giovanni Francesco Guerrieri, Italian painter and Caravaggisti (born 1589)
Giovanni Battista Michelini, Italian painter of religious and mythological subjects (born 1604)
Claes Corneliszoon Moeyaert, Catholic Dutch painter (born 1592)
Abraham van den Hecken, Dutch painter of genre pieces, religious and historical scenes, portraits and still lifes (born 1615)
Floris van Schooten, Dutch painter (born 1590)
Herman van Swanevelt, Dutch painter (born 1604)
Yi Sam-pyeong, father of Imari porcelain

 
Years of the 17th century in art
1650s in art